Love Hysteria is the second solo album by the British solo artist Peter Murphy, formerly of the gothic rock band Bauhaus. It was released in 1988.

The album was largely written with former B-Movie keyboard player Paul Statham, who had joined Murphy's band, The Hundred Men. It was produced by former member of The Fall, Simon Rogers.

Critical reception
A review at the time of its release in Underground described the album as "a coherent, tuneful package with tracks that are, on the whole, pretty listenable". Ned Raggett, writing for Allmusic, identified a continuing David Bowie influence, but stated that the album "shows Murphy fully coming into his own as a performer".

Track listing

Original 1988 release
All songs written by Peter Murphy & Paul Statham; except where noted.
 "All Night Long" — 5:42
 "His Circle and Hers Meet" — 6:01
 "Dragnet Drag" — 5:46
 "Socrates the Python" — 6:47
 "Indigo Eyes" — 5:54
 "Time Has Got Nothing to Do with It" — 5:21
 "Blind Sublime" (Peter Murphy) — 3:55
 "My Last Two Weeks" — 6:38
 "Funtime" (David Bowie, Iggy Pop) — 3:49
Bonus tracks on CD reissue:
 "I've Got a Miniature Secret Camera" (Peter Murphy, Eddie Branch) — 4:25
 "Funtime (Cabaret Mix)" (David Bowie, Iggy Pop) — 5:57

2013 re-release
Disc 1

 "All Night Long" — 5:42
 "His Circle and Hers Meet" — 6:01
 "Dragnet Drag" — 5:46
 "Socrates the Python" — 6:47
 "Indigo Eyes" — 4:54
 "Time Has Got Nothing to Do with It" — 5:21
 "Blind Sublime" — 3:55
 "My Last Two Weeks" — 6:38
 "Funtime" (Bowie, Pop) — 3:49

Disc 2

 "All Night Long" (demo) — 5:23
 "His Circle and Hers Meet" (demo) — 4:29
 "Dragnet Drag" (demo) — 5:48
 "Indigo Eyes" (demo) — 5:35
 "Blind Sublime" (demo) — 4:09
 "My Last Two Weeks" (demo) — 5:14
 "Funtime" (demo) — 3:33
 "I've Got a Miniature Secret Camera" — 4:25
 "Funtime (In Cabaret)" — 6:00
 "All Night Long" (single edit) — 4:36
 "Indigo Eyes" (single edit) — 4:09
 "Blind Sublime" (Remix Edit) — 3:50
 "Blind Sublime" (Blind Beats Mix) — 4:38
 "Blind Sublime" (Dance Remix) — 7:23

Personnel
Peter Murphy - vocals, "naive" keyboards
Faut Güner, Peter Bonas, Simon Rogers - guitar
Eddie Branch, Peter Bonas - bass
Matthew Seligman - fretless bass
Paul Statham, Simon Rogers - keyboards
Howard Hughes - piano
Terl Bryant - drums, percussion

References

Peter Murphy (musician) albums
1988 albums
Beggars Banquet Records albums